There has long been debate over the exact location of the geographical centre of the United Kingdom, and its constituent countries, due to the complexity and method of the calculation, such as whether to include offshore islands, and the fact that erosion will cause the position to change over time. There are two main methods of calculating this "centre": either as the centroid of the two-dimensional shape made by the country (projected to the Airy ellipsoid then flattened using the Transverse Mercator projection), or as the point farthest from the boundary of the country (either the sea, or, in the case of constituent countries, a land border). These two methods give quite different answers.

Traditional locations
The town of Haltwhistle in Northumberland has banners stating that it is the "Centre of Britain". By another calculation the centre can also be said to be Dunsop Bridge, Lancashire, 71 miles (114 km) to the south.

However, in 2002 the Ordnance Survey conducted studies that pinpointed the respective centres more precisely, and it is their results that are quoted below.

Centroid locations

Put simply, the centroid is the point at which a cardboard cut-out of the area could be perfectly balanced on the tip of a pencil.  Islands are assumed fixed to the mainland in their precise position by invisible rigid weightless wires. A mathematical method is used to do the balancing to a much greater accuracy than the practical method could achieve.

Unless stated, positions are the centroids of the two-dimensional shapes made by the countries. Calculations include offshore islands unless stated.

United Kingdom

Great Britain
  Whitendale Hanging Stones (#1 on the map), near Brennand Farm, outside Dunsop Bridge, Lancashire in the Forest of Bowland.()

Great Britain (mainland only) 
 A field south of Calderstones Partnership NHS Foundation Trust (#3), near Whalley, Lancashire

England
 Lindley Hall Farm (#4), Leicestershire (near Fenny Drayton and Higham on the Hill)  A plaque denoting this point, and disputing the "traditional" centre of England as being at Meriden in the West Midlands, was erected by Ordnance Survey on 14 June 2013

Northern Ireland
 Annaghone (#5), near Cookstown, County Tyrone Irish grid ref  H 84494 74047.

Scotland
 Between Blair Atholl (#6) and Dalwhinnie, Perthshire

Wales
 Near Cwmystwyth (#7), Devil's Bridge, Ceredigion

Locations found by other methods 
Point farthest from the sea

 Church Flatts Farm (#8), Coton in the Elms, Derbyshire

Point farthest from high tide mark (including tidal rivers)

 Between Hammerwich and Wall, south-west of Lichfield, Staffordshire

 Mid point of the longest north–south axis 
 Haltwhistle, Northumberland. The midpoint of the longest north–south meridian; also approximately the midpoint of each of the lines through it across Great Britain along the 16 main compass directions.

Centre of population
 This calculation depends on the method used (mean, median or geometric median; see Centre of population for details).
A calculation by Danny Dorling using the mean (least squares) method based on local authority district data from the 1990s gave the population centre of Great Britain at Appleby Parva, Leicestershire, 20 miles south of Derby.  Since then, the population centre will have moved slightly south and east.>

Centre of England

For centuries the parish of Meriden to the west of Coventry has claimed to be the geographical centre of England, and there has been a stone cross there commemorating the claim for at least 500 years. The justification is that the point farthest from the sea is in the parish. Morton, Derbyshire also claims to be the centre of England as it is not only midway along England's longest north-south axis, but also midway between the east coast and the Welsh border. Claims are also made for a tree, the Midland Oak, in Leamington Spa, Warwickshire, although the basis for these claims is not clear.

See also 
 Centre of Scotland
 Extreme points of the United Kingdom
 Centre points of counties of the United Kingdom
 Geography of the United Kingdom
 Geographical centre of Ireland
 Drainage divide

Further reading

References 

Geography of the United Kingdom
United Kingdom
United Kingdom geography-related lists